Frederick James Murphy (February 4, 1886 – December 19, 1956) was an American football, basketball, and baseball player and coach and college athletics administrator. Murphy served as the head football coach at Northwestern University (1914–1918), University of Denver (1920–1922), and University of Kentucky (1924–1926), compiling a career football coaching record of 40–37–4. He was also the head basketball coach at Manhattan College (1912–1913) and at Northwestern (1914–1917), and the head baseball coach at Northwestern (1914–1916) and Kentucky (1925–1926). In addition, Murphy served as Northwestern's athletic director from 1913 to 1918.

Playing career and family
Murphy played football, basketball, and baseball at Yale University. He was a halfback in football, a guard in basketball, and a center fielder in baseball. Murphy was a nephew of Mike Murphy and Yale Murphy.

Coaching career

Northwestern
Murphy was the 12th head coach at Northwestern University and he held that position for five seasons, from 1914 until 1918. His coaching record at Northwestern was 16–16–1. This ranks him 11th at Northwestern in total wins and tenth at Northwestern in winning percentage.

University of Denver
Murphy returned to coaching in the 1920 season to coach at the University of Denver, a coaching position he held for three seasons until 1922. At Denver, he compiled a record of 12–7–2. His best season at Denver was 1922, when the team's record was 6–1–1, second only to his 6–1 season at Northwestern in 1916.

Kentucky
Murphy's next move was to become the head coach at the University of Kentucky from 1924 to 1926. There he compiled a record of 12–14–1.

Head coaching record

Football

References

1886 births
1956 deaths
American football halfbacks
American men's basketball players
Baseball outfielders
Basketball coaches from Massachusetts
Basketball players from Massachusetts
Guards (basketball)
Denver Pioneers football coaches
Kentucky Wildcats baseball coaches
Kentucky Wildcats football coaches
Manhattan Jaspers basketball coaches
Northwestern Wildcats athletic directors
Northwestern Wildcats baseball coaches
Northwestern Wildcats football coaches
Northwestern Wildcats men's basketball coaches
People from Southborough, Massachusetts
Phillips Academy alumni
Sportspeople from Worcester County, Massachusetts
Yale Bulldogs baseball players
Yale Bulldogs football coaches
Yale Bulldogs football players
Yale Bulldogs men's basketball players